Framed Youth: The Revenge of the Teenage Perverts is a 1983 documentary film, produced by the London Lesbian and Gay Youth Video Project, in which gay and lesbian teenagers interview straight people on the streets of London about their views on homosexuality. The project involved a number of members of the London Gay Teenage Group. The film was broadcast on Channel 4 in December 1986.

Full cast and crew

 Project coordinators: Andy Lipman, Philip Timmins
 Participants:
 Mark Ashton
 Trill Burton
 Jeff Cole
 Julian Cole
 Richard Coles
 Rose Collis
 Maureen Donnelly
 Nicola Field
 Constantine (Connie) Giannaris
 Toby Kettle
 Joe Lavelle
 Pom Martin
 Carl Miller
 Graham Pyper
 Simon Shipman
 Jimmy Somerville
 Lil Trenchardy
 Royce Ullah
 David Wiseman
Sara Blount
  Additional participants:
 Chris Boot
 Gill Hayward
 Claire Hodson
 Carl Johnson
 Kim Miller
 Production group from 1985 to 1986:
 Claire Hodson
 Carmelita Kadeena-Whyte
 Dawn Thomas
 Graphics: Steve Pickard
 Editing: 
 Trill Burton
 Nicola Field
 Constantine (Connie) Giannaris
 Toby Kettle
 Pom Martin
 Jimmy Somerville
 Fine cut: Philip Timmins
 TV editing: Phil Woodward
 Song "Screaming": Jimmy Somerville
 Technicians: Ivan Burgess, Andy Ironside
 Audio post-production: David Stevens
 Picture and music research: Clare Beavan

Awards
1984: Grierson Award for Best Documentary.

References

Bibliography

External links
 
 
 

1983 films
British documentary films
Documentary films about LGBT topics
1983 documentary films
Films shot in London
LGBT culture in London
British LGBT-related films
1983 LGBT-related films
LGBT youth
1980s English-language films
1980s British films